Just Another Band from L.A. is a live album by The Mothers, released in 1972. It was recorded live on August 7, 1971, in Pauley Pavilion on the campus of UCLA in Los Angeles. A notable inclusion on this album is "Billy the Mountain", Frank Zappa's long, narrative parody of rock operas, which were gaining popularity at that time.

Originally planned for release as a double LP with solos from "Studebaker Hoch" and "The Subcutaneous Peril" taking up most of the second LP in addition to parts of "Billy the Mountain" itself, and often overlooked by reviewers, this album marks an important period in the band's career which was soon ended by Zappa's severe injuries after being pushed off a stage. The song "Eddie, Are You Kidding?" refers to Edward Nalbandian, while "The Subcutaneous Peril", which ultimately became an outtake from the album, would later appear, in an edited form, on Finer Moments (2012) instead.

The album was reissued on CD with badly flawed mastering and no composition credits by Rykodisc in 1990 and repackaged with the same audio but with the composition credits restored in 1995. In 2012 Universal/UMe issued a properly remastered edition on CD.

Track listing
All songs written, composed and arranged by Frank Zappa except where noted.

Personnel
 Frank Zappa – guitar, vocals
 Don Preston – keyboards, Minimoog
 Ian Underwood – woodwinds, keyboards, vocals
 Aynsley Dunbar – drums
 Howard Kaylan – lead vocals
 Mark Volman – lead vocals
 Jim Pons – bass guitar, vocals

Charts

References

1972 live albums
Albums produced by Frank Zappa
Frank Zappa live albums
Reprise Records live albums